Catlin Hall, also known as George Catlin Hall and Reynolds House, is a historic dormitory located on the campus of Wilkes University at Wilkes-Barre, Luzerne County, Pennsylvania.  It was built in 1843, and is a 2 1/2-story, rectangular brick building in the Greek Revival style.  It has a two-story rear wing.  It was built as the Reynolds family residence and used as such into the 1950s, after which it was sold to Wilkes College in 1957. It was used as the women's residence hall and named for Wilkes-Barre native, painter George Catlin.

It was added to the National Register of Historic Places in 1972.

References

Buildings and structures in Wilkes-Barre, Pennsylvania
Wilkes University
Residential buildings on the National Register of Historic Places in Pennsylvania
Residential buildings completed in 1843
Greek Revival architecture in Pennsylvania
1843 establishments in Pennsylvania
National Register of Historic Places in Luzerne County, Pennsylvania